These are the official results of the athletics competition at the 2005 Mediterranean Games taking place on June 29 – July 2, 2005 in Almería, Spain.

Men's results

100 meters

Heats – June 30Wind:Heat 1: -0.9 m/s, Heat 2: +0.6 m/s, Heat 3: -1.0 m/s

Final – June 30Wind:-0.4 m/s

200 meters

Heats – June 29Wind:Heat 1: +0.4 m/s, Heat 2: -1.1 m/s

Final – June 29Wind:+0.6 m/s

400 meters

Heats – June 30

Final – July 1

800 meters

Heats – June 29

Final – July 1

1500 meters
July 1

5000 meters
July 2

10,000 meters
July 1

Half marathon
July 2

110 meters hurdles

Heats – June 29Wind:Heat 1: -1.1 m/s, Heat 2: -0.5 m/s

Final – June 29Wind:+0.3 m/s

400 meters hurdles

Heats – July 2

Final – July 1

3000 meters steeplechase
July 1

4 × 100 meters relay
July 1

4 × 400 meters relay
July 2

20 kilometers walk
June 30

High jump
June 30

Pole vault
July 1

Long jump
July 2

Triple jump
June 29

Shot put
July 2

Discus throw
June 30

Hammer throw
July 1

Javelin throw
June 29

Decathlon
June 29–30

Women's results

100 meters

Heats – June 30Wind:Heat 1: +0.4 m/s, Heat 2: +0.1 m/s

Final – June 30Wind:+0.5 m/s

200 meters

Heats – June 29Wind:Heat 1: -1.4 m/s, Heat 2: -0.5 m/s

Final – June 29Wind:-1.9 m/s

400 meters
July 1

800 meters

Heats – June 30

Final – July 1

1500 meters
July 2

5000 meters
June 30

10,000 meters
June 29

Half marathon
July 2

100 meters hurdles

Heats – June 30Wind:Heat 1: -1.7 m/s, Heat 2: -0.5 m/s

Final – June 30Wind:-0.9 m/s

400 meters hurdles

Heats – June 29
	
Final – June 30

4 × 100 meters relay
July 1

4 × 400 meters relay
July 2

20 kilometers walk
June 30

High jump
July 2

Pole vault
June 29

Long jump
June 30

Triple jump
July 1

Shot put
June 30

Discus throw
July 2

Hammer throw
June 29

Javelin throw
July 1

Heptathlon
July 1–2

References
Official results
Results

Mediterranean Games
2005 Results